Shuklaganj (officially Gangaghat) is situated in Unnao district, but it is also considered as a suburb of Kanpur, Uttar Pradesh, located on the banks of holy river Ganges about 5 km from Kanpur on the SH 58 to Unnao.The population was 370803 as of the 2001 census. According to the census of 2011 it is 884072. It has 80% of literacy and is 5 km from Kanpur Cantonment. Shuklaganj was once known as Gangaghat. Though it lies in Unnao district, it lies adjacent to  Kanpur and hence is a suburb of Kanpur. The city is enlisted as a municipality of Kanpur metropolitan area.

History

Shuklaganj was established in 1931 by Aditya Savita on the bank of river Ganges. There is a holy Hindu temple of Maa Durga, having history of 400 years, which was renovated in 1965 by Maharashtrian Sant Shri Madan Keshav Amdekar also known as Guru Ji. Million of followers from all around world comes to temple to worship Maa Durga. In 1976, Bal Govind Montessori school was made for children. On every Foundation Day, 8 February, a cricket tournament is held at the Ramkali stadium which is named after the goddess Ramkali. On the 78th Foundation Day, final tournament was played.

Transport
Shuklaganj has a railway station named Kanpur Bridge Left Bank on the Kanpur-Lucknow line. Kanpur Central which is about 4 km away is the major railhead.
Kanpur Civil Airport is the nearest airport but Kanpur Chakeri airport is the nearest domestic airport. Lucknow Airport is the nearest international airport.

References 

Cities and towns in Unnao district